Falling Sky (also known as Crocodile Tears) is a 1998 American drama film starring Karen Allen, Brittany Murphy and Jeremy Jordan. It was released direct-to-video in the UK in 1999 and wasn't released in the US until August 26, 2005. It follows Emily, a girl who moves to Las Vegas with her alcoholic mother as she tries to pursue a singing career.

Synopsis 
Emily and her alcoholic mother, Reese, have moved to Las Vegas for a fresh start and so Reese can pursue a singing career. Reese tells Emily that alcoholism runs in the family and she is at risk of having it too. Emily often finds herself in the maternal role, having to take care of her mother. After Reese kills herself in the bathtub, Emily finds a recorded tape saying "I'm sorry Emily, but I'm just so tired." Devastated, Emily turns to drink, and the prophecy comes true.

After seeing what alcohol has done to her life, Emily drives to a lake and tries to drown herself. At the last minute, she gasps for air and says, "My mother chose to die. There was nothing I could do to ease her pain. Except maybe, choosing to live."

Cast

References

External links

American drama films
1998 films
American independent films
1998 independent films
1998 drama films
Films about alcoholism
Films about suicide
Films about mother–daughter relationships
Films set in the Las Vegas Valley
1998 directorial debut films
1990s English-language films
1990s American films

fi:Kaukana taivaasta